Robert Taber may refer to:

 Robert Taber (actor), American actor
 Robert Taber (author), American journalist, political scholar, and writer